Simone Schmiedtbauer (born 8 June 1974) is an Austrian politician of the Austrian People's Party (ÖVP) who has been serving as a Member of the European Parliament since 2019. 

In parliament, Schmiedtbauer has been serving on the Committee on Agriculture and Rural Development (since 2019) and the Committee on Budgetary Control (since 2022). In addition to her committee assignments, she is part of the European Parliament Intergroup on Small and Medium-Sized Enterprises (SMEs).

References

Living people
1974 births
MEPs for Austria 2019–2024
Social Democratic Party of Austria MEPs
21st-century women MEPs for Austria